Pitane fervens is a moth in the family Erebidae first described by Francis Walker in 1854. It is found in South America.

References

Phaegopterina
Moths described in 1854